Stedet Island is a small island lying at the head of Utstikkar Bay, just north of Falla Bluff, Mac. Robertson Land. Mapped by Norwegian cartographers from air photos taken by the Lars Christensen Expedition, 1936–37, and named Stedet (the place).

See also 
 List of Antarctic and sub-Antarctic islands

Islands of Mac. Robertson Land